Barry Hyde may refer to:

Barry Hyde, vocalist and guitar player in the English band The Futureheads
Barry Hyde (Home and Away), a character from the Australian soap opera Home and Away